"32 Counties" is a 1999 novelty single by Irish puppet character Dustin the Turkey.

Lyrics

The title features John Morrison, in character as Dustin the Turkey of The Den, singing a song about the 32 counties of Ireland and notable features and traditions found in each. Some counties are mentioned in a derogatory context, intended to be satirical/insulting; these are marked with (†) below.

Release
The single was sold to raise funds for the National Children's Hospital.

The song reached #1 in Ireland in November 1999.

Dave McEvoy wrote of it, "If you ask me, Dustin the Turkey should be our real cultural icon. He taught generations of kids what it meant to be Irish. Discredit authority, make fun of people from other counties, begrudge other people’s success, sing loudly even if you can’t and by no means praise anyone in government."

See also
List of number-one singles of 1999 (Ireland)

References 

1999 singles
Irish Singles Chart number-one singles
Irish novelty songs
1999 songs